Jesús Manuel Díaz Marulanda (born 14 May 2004) is a Colombian footballer who plays as a forward for Porto B, on loan from Barranquilla.

Club career
Born in Barrancas, La Guajira, Díaz made his professional debut for Barranquilla at the age of sixteen.

In July 2022, Díaz joined Porto on loan, with an option to buy. He was immediately involved in the club's 'B' team's pre-season, playing in games against the reserves of Monaco and Celta de Vigo.

Personal life
Díaz is the brother of fellow professional footballer Luis Díaz who plays for Liverpool.

Career statistics

Club

Notes

References

2004 births
Living people
People from La Guajira Department
Colombian footballers
Colombia youth international footballers
Association football forwards
Categoría Primera B players
Liga Portugal 2 players
Barranquilla F.C. footballers
FC Porto players
FC Porto B players
Colombian expatriate footballers
Colombian expatriate sportspeople in Portugal
Expatriate footballers in Portugal